The Tandy Center Subway operated in Fort Worth, Texas, from February 15, 1963 to August 30, 2002.

History
The subway was originally built by Leonard's Department Store in 1963, connecting the store to its large parking lots on the edge of downtown. Originally known as the Leonard's M&O Subway, it consisted of one underground station beneath the store and four stations in the parking lots. Between 1962 and 1966, Leonard's acquired a total of 15 PCC streetcars from DC Transit in Washington, D.C. These had been manufactured by the St. Louis Car Company in the 1930s and 1940s.

The Tandy Corporation purchased the department store, its parking lots, and the subway in 1967. The corporation built its headquarters, the Tandy Center, on the site in 1974. Although it demolished the original store, Tandy retained the subway.

The small subway primarily served patrons visiting the mall at the base of the Tandy Center, which also linked to the downtown location of Fort Worth Public Library. However, the anchor tenant moved out in 1995 and the mall declined. The Tandy Center Subway ceased operation on August 30, 2002.

After the closure, one of the streetcars used on the subway was acquired by Dallas's McKinney Avenue Transit Authority, which modified it to again make it suitable for in-street use, and it operated in service on the McKinney Avenue heritage streetcar line in Dallas until the mid-to late 2000s.  As of 2012, it remained in storage in Dallas, out of use.

"Leonard's number one" was the first PCC streetcar to run the line in 1963, the subway car was originally manufactured by the St. Louis Car Co. between 1937 and 1944 in Washington, D.C. with custom made air conditioning and heating.  The number one car is the only one of five original subway cars to survive. In April 1982 the car was saved from the cutting torch by a Tandy computer programmer and stored on a farm south of Fort Worth, where it remained for over 25 years. On February 2, 2008, it was moved to a restoration location near Benbrook, Texas.  As of late 2013, Leonard's number one is now on public display in the lobby of Texas Capital Bank, Fort Worth (One City Place). 

Parts of the tunnels that ran the cars still exist but currently closed off to the public. In 2015, Gordon Dickson with Lauren Leonard, the great-granddaughter of Obie Leonard and cousin Marty Leonard, daughter of founder Marvin Leonard, visited the tunnel with asset manager for Spire Realty Group Ryan Johnson. During that visit, the Marty Leonard signed “Remember the M&O,” with date and name on the wall closing off the tunnel.

See also
Dillard's, which bought out Leonard's in 1974.
North Texas Historic Transportation

References

External links

Tandy Subway History
Pictures of Tandy Subway Cars in Fort Worth
Parts of Subway preserved by North Texas Historic Transportation, Inc.
Pictures of Tandy Center Subway cars and facilities during the final days of operation
Video clip of Tandy Center Subway cars during the final week of operation

Rapid transit in Texas
Transportation in Fort Worth, Texas
RadioShack
Electric railways in Texas
Underground railways
Railway lines opened in 1963
1963 establishments in Texas
Railway lines closed in 2002
2002 disestablishments in Texas